Jack Ross (November 1, 1916 – December 16, 1982) was a popular rock and roll and novelty song musician and singer who was contemporary with Elvis Presley.

Discography
 "Cinderella" 1962 (No. 16 on the Billboard Hot 100)
 "Margarita", B-side "Milwaukee Stomp" 1962
 "Happy Jose [Ching Ching]", B-side "Sweet Georgia Brown"

References

1916 births
1982 deaths
20th-century American singers